Gorny, formerly known as Chita-46, is a closed urban locality (an urban-type settlement) in Ulyotovsky District of Zabaykalsky Krai, Russia. Population:  

Up until 2002 the 4th Rocket Division of the 53rd Rocket Army, Strategic Rocket Forces was located at Drovyanaya, at coordinates which very closely match Gorniy. The settlement has also hosted the 200th Artillery Brigade since 1973.

Administrative and municipal status
Within the framework of administrative divisions, Gorny is subordinated to Ulyotovsky District. As a municipal division, the urban-type settlement of Gorny is incorporated as Gorny Urban Okrug.

References

Notes

Sources

Urban-type settlements in Zabaykalsky Krai
Closed cities
